Balneola is a genus of bacteria.

See also 
 List of bacterial orders
 List of bacteria genera

References

Bacteria genera